The Nedbank Cup is a South African club football (soccer) tournament. The knockout tournament, based on the English FA Cup format, was one of a weak opponent facing a stronger one. The competition was sponsored by ABSA until 2007, after which Nedbank took over sponsorship.

The winner of the 2011–12 Nedbank Cup winners, SuperSport United, qualified for the 2013 CAF Confederation Cup.

Format
The 16 Premier Soccer League clubs, 8 National First Division teams, as well as 8 teams from the amateur ranks compete for the prize money of R6 million. The winner also qualifies for the CAF Confederation Cup.

The preliminary round features all 16 National First Division teams and will be reduced to eight when the teams play on 12 December 2012.

The teams are not seeded at any stage, and the first 16 sides drawn out of the hat receive a home-ground advantage. There are no longer any replays in the tournament, and any games which end in a draw after 90 minutes are subject to 30 minutes extra time followed by penalties if necessary.

Teams
The 32 teams competing in the Nedbank Cup competition are: (listed according to their league that they are playing in).

Premier Soccer League

 1. Ajax Cape Town
 2. AmaZulu
 3. Bidvest Wits
 4. Black Leopards
 5. Bloemfontein Celtic
 6. Free State Stars
 7. Golden Arrows
 8. Jomo Cosmos

 9. Kaizer Chiefs
 10. Mamelodi Sundowns
 11. Maritzburg United
 12. Moroka Swallows
 13. Orlando Pirates
 14. Platinum Stars
 15. Santos
 16. Supersport United

National First Division

 17. African Warriors
 18. Blackburn Rovers
 19. Mpumalanga Black Aces
 20. Polokwane City

 21. Sivutsa Stars
 22. United FC
 23. University of Pretoria
 24. Witbank Spurs

Vodacom League

 25. Roses United
 26. Ethekwini Coastal
 27. Vardos
 28. The Dolphins

 29. Batau
 30. Powerlines F.C.
 31. Cape Town All Stars
 32. North West Shining Stars

Results

Preliminary round

The preliminary round saw National First Division sides play each other is a knockout round to decide who would compete in the 2012 Nedbank Cup.

Round of 32

Round of 16

Quarter-finals

Semifinals

Final

External links
Nedbank Cup Official Website
Nedbank Official Website
Premier Soccer League
South African Football Association
Confederation of African Football

Notes and references

2011–12 domestic association football cups
2011–12 in South African soccer
2011-12